OK Calculator is a demo collection from TV on the Radio which they self-released in 2002. The album's title alludes to Radiohead's album OK Computer.

Origins

Reception
In Magnet, Bryan Bierman listed the album as a hidden gem and wrote, “Adebimpe’s voice alone makes up most of the tracks, and though the album’s rough sound takes some getting used to, this arrangement is surprisingly effective. Songs like ‘Yr God’ and ‘Aim To Please’ show off his soulful vocals, and you can hear some early signs of the later songwriting style the group would adapt. Sitek's recordings are a little more polished, using the atmospheric electronics that would later envelope a lot of TVOTR's music, like the slow ambience of ‘On A Train,” or the Kraftwerk fever dream ‘Pulse Of Pete.’”

Track listing

"Freeway" – 2:19
"Say You Do" (Samples Raymond Scott's "Night and Day" and Nina Simone's Wild is the Wind) – 5:19
"Pulse of Pete" – 3:36
"Me - I" – 3:20
"Buffalo Girls" – 2:58
"Ending of a Show" – 1:09
"Hurt You" – 6:28
"Netti Fritti" – 5:14
"Yr God" – 2:35
"On a Train" – 16:07
"Sheba Baby" – 3:56
"Y King" – 2:43
"Aim to Please" – 3:07
"Bicycles Are Red Hot" – 3:57
"Los Mataban" – 3:00
"Robots" – 3:10
"Doing My Duty" – 5:52
"Untitled" – 0:06

The tracks "Freeway" and "On a Train" later re-appeared on the 2004 7" and CD single for "Staring at the Sun".

References

External links
 Downhill Battle Interview

2002 debut albums
TV on the Radio albums
Self-released albums
Albums produced by Dave Sitek